Wu Chen-huan (born 28 September 1954) is a Taiwanese politician. He was the Political Deputy Minister of the Ministry of Justice from 1 January 2012 until September 2015.

Education
Wu obtained his bachelor's and master's degrees in law from National Taipei University, master's degree in law from American University in the United States and doctoral degree in legal science from Bond University in Australia.

Ministry of Justice
Wu served in the Ministry of Justice as counselor from November 1995 until January 1998 and September 1998 until January 2000. He became the secretary-general of the ministry in June 2000, serving in this capacity until April 2002. From May 2008 until December 2011 he was the Administrative Deputy Minister and from January 2012 until September 2015 he was the Political Deputy Minister.

See also
 Law of the Republic of China

References

Living people
1954 births
Taiwanese Ministers of Justice